Andrew John Bayly Johnston is a Canadian historian, novelist and museum writer. He is the author of five novels of historical fiction as well as sixteen books (and over 100 articles) on the History of Atlantic Canada. Johnston is originally from Truro, Nova Scotia and currently lives in Halifax.

Career
Johnston's writing career is  closely associated with the history of the Fortress of Louisbourg. In recognition of his body of work on that national historic site of Canada, the Government of France made Johnston a chevalier of the Ordre des Palmes académiques. His 2017 book Endgame 1758 won a Clio award from the Canadian Historical Association and was short-listed for the Dartmouth Book Award 

Johnston had a long career as an historian with Parks Canada.

The historical account Ni'n na L'nu: The Mi'kmaq of Prince Edward Island, co-authored with Jesse Francis, won the "best Atlantic-published" book, the PEI Book Award for non-fiction and a PEI Heritage Award.  Johnston also developed the story-lines and scripts for the exhibit of the same name. 

Johnston has written the scripts for many exhibits in Atlantic Canada. Some of those exhibits have been at (or currently still are at) the Nova Scotia Museum, the Colchester Historeum, Musée des Acadiens des Pubnicos, Yarmouth County Museum, the Black Cultural Centre, and the aforementioned travelling exhibit entitled N'in na L'nu: The Mi'kmaq of Prince Edward Island. 

Since 2009, Johnston has published three novels inspired by the historical figure of Thomas Pichon (1700–1781). They are Thomas, A Secret Life (2012), The Maze (2014) and Crossings (2015).Atlantic Books Today described Johnston as "a natural to write this story." The review of Thomas in The Antigonish Review stated: "This is a fine novel, one that strikes just the right balance between fact and fiction." As for The Maze, Paul W. Bennett writes: "Taking on historical fiction and imaginatively recreating the inner life of one of Canada's most controversial early historical figures would be beyond the reach of most scholars. A. J. B. Johnston ... is more than equal to that challenge." The reviewer in the Nashwaak Review wrote: "Pichon is as real and developed a character as you will find anywhere … both believable and impressive." Two more novels appeared in 2018, with The Hat, a YA novel about the Expulsion of the Acadians from Grand-Pré in 1755, and Something True, a coming-of-age biographical fiction about Katharine McLennan (1892-1975). 

In 2020, Nimbus Publishing released Johnston's Kings of Friday Night: The Lincolns. It's about a 1960s rock 'n roll band that was based in Truro, Nova Scotia and was widely popular across the Maritimes. Though all-white, they played mostly Soul and R&B songs, and are credited with breaking racial barriers at the time. One member of that band was renowned playwright, novelist and composer John MacLachlan Gray. Gray wrote the "Foreword" to the book. The "Afterword" was written by the band's singer, Frank MacKay. After The Lincolns and a Toronto-based band called Soma, MacKay would go on to have a celebrated career as a stage actor as well. Johnston was interviewed about the book on "Book-Me Podcasts", hosted by Costas Halavrezos. In November 2020, Johnston collaborated with Tom Ryan and Costas Halavrezos to create a 5-minute micro-documentary about The Lincolns. The video—Kings of Friday Night: The Lincolns—was posted on YouTube

Johnston's research archives are deposited at the Beaton Institute of the Cape Breton University.

In February and March 2017, Johnston was Writer-in-Residence at Wolff Cottage (the Center for the Writing Arts) in Fairhope, Alabama.

In July 2018, A. J. B. Johnston was named as one of the members of a special task force that is to make recommendations to the Halifax Regional Municipality regarding the commemoration of British colonial governor of Nova Scotia, Edward Cornwallis, and of the commemoration of Indigenous history within the municipality. That task force report was submitted to HRM mayor, council and staff in May 2020.

According to a post on Johnston's website in January 2023, his next book will be published by Acorn Press. It will be a novel entitled Into the Wind which is slated to be released in the spring of 2023.

Authored and co-authored books

Fiction
 
 EPUB 978-1-7752289-0-5
 EPUB 978-1-77206-022-5, Kindle 978-1-77206-023-2, Web pdf 978-1-77206-021-8
 EPUB 978-1-927492-71-0, MOBI 978-1-927492-72-7
 EPUB 978-1-897009-89-5, MOBI 978-1-897009-90-1

History

Current English editions and re-prints

 ASIN : B08N1L2SKP. EPUB : 

 (Canada),  (USA)

 Paperback Edition

 
 Paperback Edition

Previous English editions
 Hardcover Edition
 Hardcover Edition

Non-English editions and translations

 

	
 Paperback Edition
 Hardcover Edition

References

 Cape Breton Post, 20 March 2012

External links
 A.J.B. Johnston's website
 A.J.B. Johnston at LinkedIn

Year of birth missing (living people)
Living people
Canadian historical novelists
Canadian military historians
Historians of Atlantic Canada
Canadian male novelists
21st-century Canadian novelists
21st-century Canadian male writers
Canadian male non-fiction writers